Sotiris Pispas (born 1 August 1998) is a Greek professional footballer who plays as a striker for Gamma Ethniki club Panionios.

Career
He plays mainly as a forward, and joined Panathinaikos from the youth ranks of Panathinaikos in the winter of 2017.

Honours
Volos
Football League: 2018–19

References

External links
 

1998 births
Living people
Greece youth international footballers
Panathinaikos F.C. players
Super League Greece players
Football League (Greece) players
Association football midfielders
Volos N.F.C. players
Footballers from Athens
Greek footballers